Armeni can refer to:
 Armenoi, a village in Chania regional unit, Crete, Greece
 Armenoi, Rethymno, a village in Rethymno regional unit, Crete, Greece
 Armeni, a village in Loamneș Commune, Sibiu County, Romania
 Armeni, a village in Slobozia Ciorăști Commune, Vrancea County, Romania
 Armeni (archaeological site), an ancient Minoan cemetery on Crete
 Silvia Armeni is an Italian-born Canadian wildlife artist

See also
 Armenia